Clementia is an extinct town in Charleston County, in the U.S. state of South Carolina.

History
The community was named after Moultrie Clement, the original owner of the town site.

References

Geography of Charleston County, South Carolina
Ghost towns in South Carolina